Justin Jones is an American activist and politician from the state of Tennessee. He is the member of the Tennessee House of Representatives for District 52.

Jones earned a Bachelor of Arts from Fisk University and enrolled at Vanderbilt Divinity School. He was arrested for refusing to leave a rally held by Marsha Blackburn in October 2018. In 2019, he campaigned for the removal of a bust of Nathan Bedford Forrest from the Tennessee State Capitol. He was charged with assaulting Glen Casada, a member of the Tennessee House of Representatives, by allegedly throwing a drink at him, and Casada later agreed to drop the charges. In 2020, Jones organized a 62-day sit-in protest for racial justice outside the state capitol after the murder of George Floyd. He was arrested and faced 14 charges, which were dropped.

In 2019, Jones announced his candidacy for the United States House of Representatives in  against Jim Cooper in the 2020 elections. He did not submit enough valid signatures to make the ballot.

State Representative Mike Stewart did not run for reelection in 2022, and Jones ran to succeed him as the member of the Tennessee House for the 52nd district. Jones defeated Delishia Porterfield, a member of the Metropolitan Council of Nashville and Davidson County, in the Democratic Party primary election. He won the general election without opposition.

References

Living people
People from Nashville, Tennessee
Fisk University alumni
Tennessee Democrats
Members of the Tennessee House of Representatives
Year of birth missing (living people)